Ciénaga de Zapata is one of 14 municipalities of the Matanzas Province, Cuba, and the municipal seat is located at Playa Larga, at the northern end of the Bahia de Cochinos ("Bay of Pigs"). A large part of the municipality is protected as the Zapata Swamp.

It is the largest municipality of Cuba with 4,162 km2.

Among the villages included in the municipal territory, one of the most famous is  Playa Girón, site of the Bay of Pigs Invasion in 1961. Other villages are Bermejas, Buenaventura, Caleta del Rosario, Caleta Sábalo, El Jiquí, El Maíz, El Rincón, Guamá, Guasasa, Helechal, La Ceiba, La Florestal, La Salina, Maneadero, Palpite, Playa Maceo, Playa Maquina, San Blás, San Lázaro, Santo Tomás and Sopillar.

In 2004, the municipality of Cienaga de Zapata had a population of 8,611.

References

External links

Populated places in Matanzas Province